KPFW-LD, virtual channel 18 (VHF digital channel 5), is a low-powered television station licensed to Dallas, Texas, United States. The station is owned by DTV America Corporation. It is not available on Charter Spectrum or FiOS from Frontier at this time.

History
KPFW-LD began as K61HP, a translator for Gainesville of Dallas-based KNOK-LP (now KZFW-LD). They changed to the call sign KPFW-LP in 2008, and began broadcasting in digital on channel 61 from Cedar Hill, southwest of Dallas.

In 2010, KPFW-LP moved to channel 29 while keeping its virtual channel assignment of 61. Shortly thereafter, KPFW-LP changed its virtual channel to 18 in anticipation of a future swap of RF channels with KTXA. On January 20, 2011, KTXA began transmitting on channel 29. KPFW has been licensed to transmit on channel 18 since February 28, 2011. On March 16, 2011, the station changed its call sign to KPFW-LD.

On June 25, 2019, KPFW-LD shut down its channel 18 digital transmitter as a part of the broadcast frequency repacking process following the 2016-2017 FCC incentive auction.  The station remains silent while it constructs its post-repack facility on assigned displacement channel 5.

Digital channels

The station's digital signal is multiplexed:

References

External links

Television stations in the Dallas–Fort Worth metroplex
Television channels and stations established in 2008
Low-power television stations in the United States
Stadium (sports network) affiliates